Reedsville is the name of some places in the United States of America:
Reedsville, Ohio
Reedsville, Pennsylvania
Reedsville, West Virginia
Reedsville, Wisconsin

See also
Reidsville (disambiguation)